It's Only TV... But I Like It is a comedy celebrity panel gameshow about television. It originally aired on BBC One from 3 June 1999 through 23 August 2002. Its presenter was Jonathan Ross, and the regular team captains were Julian Clary, Jack Dee (series 1 only), and Phill Jupitus.

Overview
The teams played through various rounds in order to gain points. Whichever team had the most points at the end was declared the winner. If both teams had equal points at the end, then the result was declared as a draw with no tie-breaker played.

Rounds
There were various rounds played throughout the series, including:
 TV Trivia – In this round, each team is shown three clips which have a tenuous link to a moment in television history. It is up to the teams to try and decipher the link.
 Bad News or Are You Sitting Down? – Here, the teams are shown a clip from a TV show, but the clip is paused before a piece of bad news is delivered. The teams must guess what bad news is. Programmes varied in this round from soaps like Coronation Street and EastEnders to crime dramas such as The Bill or The Sweeney, period dramas such as Poldark or Martin Chuzzlewit to children's programmes like Pingu, Fireman Sam, Bob the Builder and Noddy.
 Here's One I Made Earlier – Inspired by the long-running BBC series Blue Peter, the teams are given ingredients to a real Blue Peter "make", and asked to come up with what they think the presenter made out of them.
 Channel Hopping – In this round the guests make their way into the TV screen (in reality, an elevated section of the stage behind Jonathan), and the team captains don special earmuffs to block out any noise. The captains also have a remote control to choose one of five TV programmes, which the guests must mime along to the theme tune in order for their captain to guess the programme. From series 2, this game was played in every episode, having been in half the episodes of series 1. From series 3, each captain would have a pair of earmuffs decorated to look like a certain television programme.
 Opportunity Knockers – The teams are shown three clips of performers on talent shows such as New Faces, Opportunity Knocks or such programmes, and are asked to guess which of the three acts is still performing today. One such clip showed a teenage Toni Warne who in 2012 became a contestant on The Voice.
 Granny Knows Best – The teams are shown a montage of elderly people describing a television programme in an obtuse way, and are asked what programme they are talking about. If they guess it correctly from the first montage the team are awarded five points, but if they don't then they are shown a second montage where the clues become easier but the point value decreases the more clues they get. 
 Masks  – Where the team dons blindfolds and the opposing captain applies masks to the blindfolds of the opposite team, all of whom are faces from the same TV programme. The team then has to ask questions to the opposing side to guess who they are wearing masks of, mainly using yes-or-no questions. The teams could also occasionally score bonus points for guessing the character or personality on their mask.
 Dubbing - Each team is shown a clip of a television programme such as One Man and His Dog, The Clangers or Wildlife on One, but without the sound. The teams then provide a new dub over the clip (usually the team captain providing the narration while the guests provide incidental noises or additional commentary). Shown to the audience, but not the teams, is a list of five words related to the clip. Points are awarded for every word on the list that the teams get correct.
 Aliens  – In this round, the teams are shown three aliens, one of which appeared in Doctor Who. The teams then ask the aliens questions as to their identities before voting on which is the real alien. Points are awarded for guessing correctly.
 Wine Tasting – The teams are given a wine to taste (which had appeared on Food and Drink) and are asked to guess what the presenters said about the wine. Points are awarded for each correct description. In one variant of this round the contestants are asked to taste a beer, in this case the beer in question was Weihenstephaner.
 Let's Laugh at Foreigners – The teams are shown three acts performing at a Eurovision Song Contest, and are asked which act got the lowest points.
 Are You Being Serviced? – The teams are shown a clip from a sitcom, usually Are You Being Served? after which the round was named, and the clip is paused before the punchline is delivered. The teams have to guess what the punchline is.
 Charley Says – Based on the Charley Says series of public information films, the teams are shown a public information film which is paused before the message is delivered. The teams have to guess what the film's message is.
The show always ended with a quickfire round with the teams on their buzzers. The three quickfire rounds were:
 Catchphrase – Played in Series 1, the teams simply had to complete the unfinished catchphrases read out by Jonathan.
 Who Said That? – Played in Series 2 and 3, Jonathan would read out a line of dialogue from a TV programme and the teams have to guess the character or person who said it.
 Quickfire Trivia – Played in Series 4, this was a straightforward round of quickfire trivia questions, also incorporating catchphrases and identifying two TV personalities morphed together into one picture.

Return
The show returned on 5 March 2011 for a special during the BBC's 24 Hour Panel People in aid of Comic Relief 2011.  The show's former team captain Jack Dee hosted with Ulrika Jonsson and Charlie Brooker as team captains. The guests were David Walliams, Danny Wallace, Tom Deacon, and Penny Smith.

Episodes
The coloured backgrounds denote the result of each of the shows:

 – indicates Julian's team won
 – indicates Jack's/Phill's team won
 – indicates the game ended in a draw

Series 1 (1999)

Series 2 (2000)

Series 3 (2001)

Series 4 (2002)

External links

1990s British comedy television series
2000s British comedy television series
1999 British television series debuts
2002 British television series endings
BBC television game shows
British panel games
English-language television shows
Television series about television
1990s British game shows
2000s British game shows